Velleia paradoxa, or spur velleia, is a small, softly pubescent perennial herb in the family Goodeniaceae, endemic to Australia. It is found in South Australia, Tasmania, Victoria, New South Wales and southern Queensland. It grows in sclerophyll forest and grassland.

The species was first described as Velleia paradoxa by the botanist Robert Brown in 1810 and the name has never been revised. It has two varieties: V. paradoxa var. humilis DC., Prodr. 7(2): 518 (1839), and V. paradoxa var. stenoptera F.Muell. ex Benth., Fl. Austral. 4: 48 (1868).

References

External links 
 The Australasian Virtual Herbarium – Distribution
 PlantNET – Description

paradoxa
Flora of Queensland
Flora of New South Wales
Flora of Tasmania
Flora of South Australia
Taxa named by Robert Brown (botanist, born 1773)
Flora of Victoria (Australia)
Plants described in 1810